Cleophus "Cleo" Littleton (born December 31, 1932) is a former American college basketball player who played for Wichita State University, then known as The Municipal University of Wichita.

Littleton was the first college basketball player located west of the Mississippi River to score more than 2,000 points in his career and remains the all-time leading scorer in Wichita State basketball history.  Littleton's career was also notable in that he was one of the first African American basketball players to star in the Missouri Valley Conference.

Littleton was drafted by the NBA Fort Wayne Pistons in 1955, but on the advice of coach Ralph Miller, he opted to stay in Wichita, playing with the Vickers AAU team, and beginning his business career. In 1987, he started his own construction company, Litco Inc., which he still managed as of 2000. He was named the 2004 Small Business Administration's (SBA) Graduate of the Year.

References

External links
Kansas Athletic Hall of Fame profile

1932 births
Living people
Amateur Athletic Union men's basketball players
American men's basketball players
Basketball players from Wichita, Kansas
Basketball players from Oklahoma
Fort Wayne Pistons draft picks
Forwards (basketball)
Wichita State Shockers men's basketball players